Parkhali, also known in Turkish as Barhal or Altıparmak, is a village that contains a medieval Georgian monastery and cathedral church. It is located near the town of Yusufeli, Artvin Province, Turkey, and part of Yusufeli District.

History

The monastery and cathedral church was built by Davit III Kurapalat (earlier than 973) and decorated with murals. One of the oldest Georgian hagiographial novels, Martyrdom of the Holy Queen Shushanik was written here.

Population
As of 2021, the village had a population of 399 people.

Notes

Georgian churches in Turkey
Artvin
Buildings and structures in Artvin Province
Georgian Orthodox monasteries